The Canberra class''' is a ship class of two landing helicopter dock (LHD) ships built for the Royal Australian Navy (RAN). Planning to upgrade the navy's amphibious fleet began in 2000, based on Australian experiences leading the International Force for East Timor peacekeeping operation. The Spanish design was selected in 2007, with Navantia responsible for construction of the ships from the keel to the flight deck, and BAE Systems Australia handling the fabrication of the combat and communications systems. Finally, Siemens (Germany) supplied and fitted the azimuth thrusters.

Construction of the first ship, commenced in late 2008, with the hull launched in early 2011, and sea trials in early 2014. Canberra was commissioned in November 2014. Work on the second vessel, started in early 2010. Adelaide was commissioned in December 2015.

The ships are home-ported at Fleet Base East in Sydney (which has prompted complaints from nearby residents about machinery noise, exhaust fumes, and blocked views) and will regularly operate out of Townsville, the location of Lavarack Barracks, home of the Australian Army's 3rd Brigade. In addition to being located in North Queensland close to Asia and the Pacific Islands, one of the 3rd Brigade's infantry battalions, the 2nd Battalion, Royal Australian Regiment (2 RAR), was selected to become the Army's specialist amphibious infantry battalion.

Planning and selection
The importance of amphibious warfare had been demonstrated during Australia's leadership of the International Force for East Timor peacekeeping operation: the difficulty in supporting an expeditionary force to one of Australia's nearest neighbours demonstrated the need for an improved amphibious sealift capability. In November 2003, the Minister for Defence, Robert Hill, released a Defence Capability Review, which stated that two ships of at least  displacement and capable of launching five to six helicopters simultaneously were being sought. The acquisition was included under the procurement designation Project JP2048: although Phase 1 of JP2048 looked at a new type of landing craft for the Kanimbla class (the LCM2000), Phases 2 and 4 were to identify, then acquire the new amphibious warfare ships, and Phase 3 covered the design and construction of compatible landing craft (12 LCM-1E, ordered on 27 September 2011).Office of Stephen Smith MP, Minister for Defence, Projects of concern – Update The ships were originally to replace one of the Kanimbla-class ships and Tobruk, with the other Kanimbla-class ship later replaced by a strategic sealift ship.

After the announcement, suggestions for alternate names were expressed in several venues. The Navy League of Australia proposed that Adelaide should instead be named Australia; using the name of the nation and its capital for the RAN's two most powerful ships, as had been the case with the navy's two World War II-era County-class cruisers, while freeing the name up for the League's proposed fourth Hobart-class destroyer. Alternately, a member of the Australian Naval Institute opined that the ships should be named Gallipoli and Guadalcanal; the first reflecting the landings at Gallipoli, one of the first amphibious operations of the modern era, the second recognising the amphibious campaign to recapture Guadalcanal and the efforts of the United States Navy and United States Marine Corps in aiding Australia during World War II.

A Request For Information and invitation for tenders was sent to two European shipbuilders in February 2004; French company Direction des Constructions Navales (DCN) and Spanish company Navantia. Shipbuilders from the United States were not included, as American amphibious warfare ships were too large for Australian requirements, and were either too personnel-intensive or could not operate the number of helicopters required. A design being built by Navantia for the Spanish Navy, the "Buque de Proyección Estratégica" (Strategic Projection Ship, later commissioned as ) was offered by the Spanish, partnering with Australian company Tenix Defence. Although  larger and with an increased troop, vehicle, and helicopter carrying capability compared to the Mistrals, the Spanish ship was still under construction at the time of the offer, and was not due to enter service until late 2008. On 20 June 2007, Minister for Defence Brendan Nelson announced that the A$3 billion contract to build the Canberra class had been awarded to Navantia and Tenix. Although an unproven design, the Spanish offer was closer to the RAN's requested requirements, and there were benefits from ordering the Canberras and the new  air warfare destroyers from the same company.

At around the time the decision to purchase the ships was made, many defence analysts advocated for acquiring a larger number of smaller vessels on the grounds that this would be better suited to conditions in Australia's region. However, the Navy's Sea Power Centre argued that large amphibious vessels would provide greater flexibility.

Hugh White, a former leading defence planner for the Hawke and Howard Governments, ANU Professor and defence writer for the SMH, has long been a critic of the decision to acquire the Canberra-class ships. In 2004 he argued that the Australian Defence Force did not need the capacity to conduct a major opposed amphibious operation, as it was unlikely to ever be called upon to do so, and the money needed to purchase the vessels would be better spent on smaller amphibious ships and other defence capabilities. In 2016 White judged the ships to be a 'terrible and heroic, waste of money and nothing more than, 'big, fat... targets in the South China Sea'. which are too vulnerable for deployment in a serious crisis.

Design and capabilities
Keeping the maximum draught low was an important factor during design, allowing the ships to operate in littoral waters and small harbours. At full load, each ship will displace , making them the largest vessels to serve in the RAN. The Canberras have the same physical dimensions as Juan Carlos I, but differ in the design of the island superstructure and the internal layout, in order to meet Australian conditions and requirements. Unlike the Spanish vessel, the Australian ships are built to meet Lloyd's Naval Rules.

Propulsion is provided by two Siemens Navantia  azimuth thrusters, each with an onboard electric motor, driving two  diameter propellers.Amphibious Ships, in Semaphore, p. 2 The electricity is provided by a combined diesel and gas system, with a single General Electric LM2500 turbine producing , supported by two Navantia MAN 16V32/40 diesel generators providing . The main thrusters are supplemented by two  bow thrusters, and a  Progener-Mitsubishi S16MPTA diesel generator is fitted as an emergency backup.

HMAS Canberra was reported to have completed a major maintenance period in the Captain Cook Graving Dock at Garden Island during which the propulsion pods were replaced including new 4 bladed propellers.  At the time of reporting (March 2021) Canberra was preparing for sea trials and plans were being made for HMAS Adelaide to undergo similar maintenance.

Each ship is fitted with a Saab 9LV Mark 4 combat management system. The sensor suite includes a Sea Giraffe 3D surveillance radar, and a Vampir NG infrared search and track system. For self-defence, the LHDs are fitted with four Rafael Typhoon  remote weapons systems (one in each corner of the flight deck), six  machine guns, an AN/SLQ-25 Nixie towed torpedo decoy, and a Nulka missile decoy.Defense Industry Daily, Australia's Canberra class LHDs Planned upgrades include the installation of up to three Phalanx CIWS from 2018. Defence against aircraft and larger targets is to be provided by escort vessels and air support from the Royal Australian Air Force (RAAF). The ships' companies consist of 358 personnel; 293 RAN, 62 Australian Army, and 3 RAAF.

The LHDs are able to transport 1,046 soldiers and their equipment, and can carry 1,600 in overload conditions.McPhedran, Inside HMAS Canberra The embarked force is called the Amphibious Ready Element Landing Force (ARE-LE) based on an infantry company of up to 220 soldiers. Army planners considered several options for forming an amphibious force including training a dedicated infantry battalion, training several battalions with battalion rotations or creating a brigade size force similar to the U.S. Marines MEU and Royal Marines 3 Commando Brigade structure. In December 2011, 2nd Battalion, Royal Australian Regiment (2RAR) was selected to develop the initial amphibious capability with the Chief of Army stating that as the capability is developed a future model for the force will be decided. A special forces capability will be provided by the 2nd Commando Regiment with the potential in the future for elements of 2RAR to be trained in certain special forces skills. The heavy vehicle deck may alternately be used for cargo, with a capacity of 196 shipping containers. Each ship has a  well deck, that houses up to four LHD Landing Craft (LLC, the RAN designation for the LCM-1E), which can be launched and recovered in conditions up to Sea State 4. Twelve were ordered from Navantia, which delivered them in batches of four during 2014 and 2015. Six LLC are assigned to each LHD, with the additional craft used for training and trials at shore bases, and rotated to their parent ship when embarked craft require maintenance. The well deck also has room for four rigid-hulled inflatable boats (although these will not be carried as standard), and can be used by other nations' landing craft and amphibious vehicles.

Alternately, helicopters up to Chinook size can take off or land simultaneously on four spots on the flight deck. Flight operations can be conducted up to Sea State 5. The standard air group aboard these ships will be a mix of MRH-90 transport helicopters and MH-60R anti-submarine helicopters. The  hangar deck can accommodate eight medium-size helicopters, and an additional ten can be carried if the light vehicle deck is used for additional helicopter space. Two aircraft lifts (one large one centre-aft, and a smaller one to starboard and in front of the island superstructure) connect the flight and hangar decks.

The ski-jump ramp of Juan Carlos I has been retained for the RAN ships, although is not intended for use. The Spanish use the ramp to launch Harrier jet aircraft, and although operating STOVL aircraft was decided against early in the Australian procurement process due to cost and detraction from the ships' main role, redesigning the ship to remove the ramp would have added unnecessary cost to the project. The retention of the ski-jump has prompted multiple recommendations that fixed-wing aircraft be operated from the ships (primarily envisaged as a flight group of F-35B Lightning II STOVL aircraft).Borgu, Capability of First Resort?, p. 11Gillis, Interview. Landing Helicopter Dock Project – Canberra Class, p. 29 The RAN has maintained that embarking Australian-operated, fixed-wing aircraft was not under consideration, although has conceded that cross-decking with other nations' aircraft could possibly occur. In May 2014, Minister for Defence David Johnston stated in media interviews that the government was considering acquiring F-35B fighters for the Canberras, and Prime Minister Tony Abbott instructed 2015 Defence White Paper planners to consider the option of embarking F-35B squadrons aboard the two ships.Butterly, Jump jets on Defence radar This assessment found that the cost of modifying the ships to operate jets would be very high, and the idea was rejected before the completion of the White Paper.

Opponents to operating F-35s from the Canberra class state that embarking enough aircraft to be an effective force would require abandoning their capability as amphibious warfare vessels, operating as an aircraft carrier would make the ships higher profile targets and need greater escorting forces, existing fuel and ordnance storage would not be able to sustain fixed-wing operations, structural modifications were needed to reinforce and heat-treat the flight deck to withstand F-35B vertical thrust, and the F-35B project itself has been the most expensive and most problematic of the three Joint Strike Fighter variants.Brabin-Smith & Schreer, Jump jets for the ADF? Supporters counter that providing fixed-wing air support close to amphibious operations maximises aircraft capability, other nations are already working on solutions to structural and thrust problems for other Harrier-era ships, and the presence of a ski-jump makes the vessels already more suitable for STOVL operations than equivalent amphibious ships with flat flight decks.

Construction
Navantia was contracted to construct the hulls from 104 'blocks' or 'modules', which were fabricated individually at Navantia's facilities in Ferrol and Fene, then combined on the slipway at the Ferrol shipyard.Fish, First Australian LHD takes shape The Canberras were built up to the flight deck, launched, then transported by Dockwise's heavy lift ship, to Williamstown, Victoria, where the installation of the island superstructure and the internal fitout of the hull was completed by BAE Systems Australia (which acquired Tenix in mid-2008).

Construction of Canberra began in September 2008, when the first steel was cut. The first three blocks were laid down on 23 September 2010. She was launched on 17 February 2011.Cavas, Australia's Largest Ship Launched The hull was loaded onto the heavy lift ship Blue Marlin on 4 August 2012, with Blue Marlin departing Ferrol for Williamstown on 17 August, and arriving in Port Phillip on 17 October.<ref>Navantia efectúa con éxito el 'encaje' del 'Canberra, in Laopinióncoruña</ref>Huge Navy ship hull arrives in Victoria, in ABC News Canberra commenced sea trials on 3 March 2014. Contractor-run sea trials concluded in early September, and Canberra was commissioned into the RAN on 28 November 2014.ABC News, HMAS Canberra enters commission into Australian Navy at Sydney ceremony

Work on Adelaide began during February 2010, when the first steel was cut. The first hull blocks were laid down on 18 February 2011, and Adelaide was launched on 4 July 2012.Royal Australian Navy, Launch of second Amphibious Ship Landing Helicopter Dock Initially, the ship was due to reach Australia in early 2013 to begin final fitout, but this did not occur. The hull was loaded onto Blue Marlin on 10 December 2013 in Vigo Bay. Blue Marlin and Adelaide arrived at Williamstown on 7 February 2014. Entry into RAN service was originally planned for mid-2015, but as of July 2011, this had been pushed back to sometime in 2016. Fitting out of the ship progressed at a faster rate than expected, which has brought the predicted commissioning date back to late 2015. After sea trials ended in October, Adelaide was commissioned on 4 December 2015. Although Canberra was identified as "LHD01" and Adelaide as "LHD02" during construction, the ships were commissioned with the pennant numbers LHD 02 and LHD 01 respectively. The reversal of the numbers causes the new ships' pennants to correspond to the s with the same names.

The early decommissioning of the two Kanimbla-class vessels in 2011, several years before Canberra-class ships would enter service, led to the acquisition of the landing ship dock  and the support vessel . The latter was only intended as a stop-gap acquisition, and in mid-2014, Ocean Shield'' was transferred to the Australian Customs and Border Protection Service.

Ships

Basing arrangements 

The two LHDs are officially home-ported at Fleet Base East in Sydney. On 4 December 2015, the support centre for the class at Garden Island was named after Captain John Robertson. Robertson was commanding officer of the carrier  at the time of the Melbourne–Voyager collision in 1964, and was widely seen to be a scapegoat after the first Royal Commission found him to be at fault.

Basing the two ships at Fleet Base East prompted complaints, including a short lived unsuccessful public campaign to have the ships based elsewhere from nearby residents in Potts Point and Wooloomooloo. Issues raised include exhaust fumes and noise pollution from the ships' generators and machinery running around-the-clock, and that the large ships block views of Sydney Harbour. To alleviate concerns, Defence began investigating options to relocate one or both ships to the northern portion of Garden Island, and has installed shore-powered air-conditioning units (allowing the ships' onboard generators to be shut down at night). Such units were, however, not installed or deemed a requirement and local residents objection's considered either incorrect, such as the claim the ship's block views or minor when compared to the decades old Navy base as a whole such as the objections raised about noise. 

The ships regularly operate out of Townsville, the base of 2RAR. To this end, the Department of Defence contributed A$30 million to the A$85 million upgrade of the multi-purpose Berth 10 at the Port of Townsville, which was completed in October 2013. Naval vessels have been allocated 45 days of berthing per year. Defence also spent A$5.3 million to lease and develop a dedicated staging area for equipment and personnel within the Port of Townsville precinct.

References

Citations

Sources

Books

Journal articles and papers

News articles

Press releases

Websites

External links 

 Defence Materiel Organisation Amphibious Deployment and Sustainment – JP 2048 Phase 4A/B

 
Amphibious warfare vessel classes